Cao Zheng is a fictional character in Water Margin, one of the Four Great Classical Novels in Chinese literature. Nicknamed "Knife Wielding Demon", he ranks 81st among the 108 Stars of Destiny and 45th among the 72 Earthly Fiends.

Background
Cao Zheng is a butcher from Dongjing (東京; present-day Kaifeng, Henan), the imperial capital of the Song Empire. Due to his slick skill in slaughtering and cutting up animals, he is nicknamed "Knife Wielding Demon". He has learnt fighting skill from Lin Chong when the latter was martial arts instructor of the imperial troops.

After losing everything in a business attempt in Shandong, Cao Zheng settles down there, unable to afford the trip home. He marries a local woman and runs an inn not far from Yellow Mud Ridge (黃泥崗; believed to be somewhere in present-day Yuncheng County, Shandong) with his wife.

Becoming an outlaw
After being robbed at Yellow Mud Ridge of the valuables he was escorting to Dongjing which were birthday gift for Grand Tutor Cai Jing, Yang Zhi deserts the escort party for fear he would be punished. He wanders in despair and comes to Cao Zheng's inn. When he, penniless, tries to leave without paying Cao's wife for his meal, the butcher rushes out from the kitchen to block his way. As they are fighting, Cao suddenly breaks off realising that Yang is no ordinary man. He is delighted to learn that the man is Yang Zhi, who is reputed to be a highly-skilled fighter.

Cao Zheng recommends Yang Zhi join the outlaw band led by DengLong at Mount Twin Dragons in Qingzhou. When Yang is approaching the hill, he runs into Lu Zhishen, and the two, assuming the other is hostile, fight each other to a standstill. They finally think it is wiser to know the other's identity. Lu, who is running away from arrest by Grand Marshal Gao Qiu for having thwarted his plot to murder Lin Chong, tells Yang that Deng Long would not accept him and has barricaded the only way up the hill. The two head to the inn of Cao Zheng, who proposes a plan to get into the stronghold.

Cao Zheng and Yang Zhi take a tied-up Lu Zhishen to Mount Twin Dragons, claiming that they have caught him after he got drunk and are delivering him for a reward. Glad to hear that Lu, who has overwhelmed him in their fight, is captured, Deng Long orders the group be let in. Upon seeing Deng, Lu Zhishen breaks free and hacks him to death. Lu and Yang take over the stronghold. Cao Zheng joins them later.

Joining Liangshan 
After being beaten in his military attack on Liangshan Marsh, the imperial general Huyan Zhuo flees to Qingzhou (in present-day Shandong), where he volunteers to wipe out all the local bandits to redeem himself. Concluding that Huyan is a tough opponent, Mount Twin Dragons and two other strongholds in Qingzhou request help from Liangshan. Song Jiang comes to Qingzhou with a force and captures and wins over Huyan. The bandits of Mount Twin Dragons, including Cao Zheng, are absorbed into Liangshan.

Campaigns and death
Cao Zheng is appointed as the chief butcher of Liangshan after the 108 Stars of Destiny came together in what is called the Grand Assembly. He is in charge of the slaughtering of pigs, cattle and poultry. He participates in the campaigns against the Liao invaders and rebel forces in Song territory following amnesty from Emperor Huizong for Liangshan.

In the battle of Xuanzhou (宣州; present-day Xuancheng, Anhui) in the campaign against Fang La, Cao Zheng is killed by a poisoned arrow.

References
 
 
 
 
 
 
 

72 Earthly Fiends
Fictional characters from Henan